Bhola Rijal is a consultant Gynaecologist, Obstetrician and litterateur of Nepal. He has expertise in In-vitro fertilization which helps against fertilization. Born in Dharan, the eastern hub of the country, in July 1948, Dr. Rijal has pioneered In-vitro fertilization in Nepal a major treatment for infertility, thereby providing joy and hope for many couples. He is also the initiator for legalizing abortion in Nepal. Alongside his medical profession, Dr Rijal’s patriotism is reflected in his literatures and outstanding song writing ability, which has made him a renowned lyricists and singer in Nepal. He also participated in Melancholy, a song by 365 Nepali renowned singers and musicians. This song was recorded in a single day on 19 May 2016 at Radio Nepal Studio, Kathmandu on Nipesh DHAKA's lyrics, Music and direction.

References 

Living people
People from Sunsari District
People from Dharan
Order of Gorkha Dakshina Bahu
Nepalese obstetricians
Nepalese gynaecologists
Nepalese surgeons
Year of birth missing (living people)